This is a list of episodes for the television series Chico and the Man, which ran from 1974 to 1978 (despite the death of actor Freddie Prinze, who played Chico, in January 1977).

Series overview
{| class="wikitable plainrowheaders" style="text-align:center"
! colspan=2| Season
! Episodes
! First aired
! Last aired
|-
| style="width:5px; background:#006400"|
| 1
| 22
| 
| 
|-
| bgcolor="000070"|
| 2
| 22
| 
| 
|-
| bgcolor="700070"|
| 3
| 21
| 
| 
|-
| bgcolor="000000"|
| 4
| 23 
| 
| 
|-
|}

Episodes

Season 1 (1974–75)

Season 2 (1975–76)

Season 3 (1976–77)

Season 4 (1977–78)

References

External links
 
 

Chico and the Man